Juvigny les Vallées is a commune in the department of Manche, northwestern France. The municipality was established on 1 January 2017 by merger of the former communes of Juvigny-le-Tertre (the seat), La Bazoge, Bellefontaine, Chasseguey, Chérencé-le-Roussel, Le Mesnil-Rainfray and Le Mesnil-Tôve.

See also 
Communes of the Manche department

References 

Communes of Manche